The Continental Uptight Band were a Dutch band formed in 1969 in Utrecht, and active till 1980. They had three hit singles in the Netherlands with "Please Sing A Song For Us", "Beautiful Friendship" and "On the Ride (You Do It Once, You Do It Twice)".

Discography
Beautiful Friendship 1970
Roots 1972

References

Dutch musical groups
1969 establishments in the Netherlands